The 2016 CS Lombardia Trophy was a senior international figure skating competition held in September 2016 in Bergamo, Italy. It was part of the 2016–17 ISU Challenger Series. Medals were awarded in the disciplines of men's singles, ladies' singles, pair skating, and ice dancing.

Entries
With the exception of the host, each country is allowed to enter up to three entries per discipline. The International Skating Union published the entry lists on 11 August 2016:

Withdrew before starting orders were drawn
 Men: Valtter Virtanen (FIN), Kévin Aymoz (FRA), Alexander Bjelde (GER), Franz Streubel (GER), Simone Cervi (ITA), Ivan Righini (ITA), Matteo Rizzo (ITA), Davide Lewton Brain (MON)
 Ladies: Emilia Toikkanen (FIN), Léa Serna (FRA), Sara Casella (ITA), Daša Grm (SLO), Nicole Rajičová (SVK)
 Pairs: Marcelina Lech / Aritz Maestu (ESP)
 Ice dancing: Anna Cappellini / Luca Lanotte (ITA), Juulia Turkkila / Matthias Versluis (FIN), Kate Louise Bagnall / Benjamin Allain (FRA)

Senior results

Men

Ladies

Pairs

Ice dancing

Junior results

Men

Ladies

Pairs

References

External links
 2016 Lombardia Trophy at the International Skating Union
 2016 Lombardia Trophy at the Federazione Italiana Sport di Ghiaccio (FISG)

Lombardia Trophy
Lombardia Trophy
Lombardia Trophy